Tenth Presbyterian Church is a congregation of approximately 1,600 members located in Center City, Philadelphia, Pennsylvania, United States. Tenth is affiliated with the Presbyterian Church in America (PCA), a denomination in the Reformed (Calvinist) tradition. It is located at the southwest corner of 17th & Spruce Streets in Philadelphia's Rittenhouse Square neighborhood, in the southwestern quadrant of Center City.

History

The original Tenth Presbyterian Church, founded in 1829 as a congregation part of the Presbyterian Church in the United States of America, was located on the northeast corner of 12th & Walnut Streets. It established a daughter church in 1855–1856 called the West Spruce Street Presbyterian Church on the southwest corner of 17th & Spruce Streets. The two churches worked together, with the ministers exchanging pulpits each week. Because of membership decline in the original Tenth Church caused by population shifts, the two churches merged in 1893 at the 17th & Spruce Streets location, taking the name of the older church (Tenth Presbyterian Church).

West Spruce Street/Tenth Church was designed by architect John McArthur Jr., who was a member of the congregation. Its  tower-and-spire was the tallest structure in Philadelphia from 1856 to the erection of the tower of Philadelphia City Hall in 1894, also designed by McArthur. In 1893, architect Frank Miles Day was hired to perform major alterations to the church's exterior and interior decoration.  The church's steeple with its 150-foot wooden spire was weakened due to structural decay of the timber frame, and was removed in 1912 due to fears that it would collapse.

The Philadelphia Presbytery (PC-USA) was a conservative bastion during the fundamentalist-modernist controversy of the 1920s and 1930s, and Tenth Presbyterian was no exception. Under the influence of longtime pastor Donald Barnhouse (1927–1960), the congregation became the conservative Presbyterian church in Center City, and it has remained a conservative and evangelical congregation until this day. Under James Montgomery Boice (1968–2000), the congregation continued to be a center of conservative Reformed theology. Tenth membership continued to grow after World War II, and ministry efforts to college students gave the congregation a metropolitan focus.

Under Boice's pastorate, Tenth grew from 350 members to a congregation over 1,200.

In 1979, following a denominational ruling by the United Presbyterian Church in the United States of America requiring congregations to elect both men and women as ruling elder, Tenth Presbyterian left the UPCUSA in 1980, joining the more conservative Reformed Presbyterian Church, Evangelical Synod. Three years afterward, Tenth followed the RPCES into the Presbyterian Church in America, a church of Southern origin.

After a lengthy property battle, the congregation was allowed to leave the UPCUSA while keeping its Byzantine-style property. Tenth Presbyterian is considered the "big-steeple" PCA congregation in the northeastern United States. The church sponsors an extensive global missions program, and an outreach to the neighborhood includes a strong connection to the rising generation of doctors, interns, and residents attending the medical schools in the neighborhood.

Senior Ministers

Some notable staff members of the church from its founding include:
Thomas McAuley, D.D., LL.D. Senior Pastor. 1829–1833
Henry Augustus Boardman, D.D. Senior Pastor. 1833–1876
Marcus A. Brownson, D.D. Senior Pastor. 1897–1924
Donald Grey Barnhouse, Th.D., D.D. Senior Pastor. 1927–1960
Mariano Di Gangi, D.D. Senior Pastor. 1961–1967
James Montgomery Boice, Th.D., D.D. Senior Minister. 1968–2000
Philip G. Ryken, DPhil Senior Minister. 1995–2010, now president of Wheaton College 
 Liam Goligher, D.Min. May 22, 2011 – Present

Notable members have included C. Everett Koop, Surgeon General of the United States during the Reagan administration and one-time head of Pediatrics at the University of Pennsylvania and Children's Hospital of Philadelphia.

Ministries
Three Sunday services with approximately 1,400 people in weekly attendance
ACTS Ministries: mercy ministries to the poor and homeless near Tenth Church
Tenth College Fellowship is a group for college students, helping them to be connected in the church and to grow spiritually during their college years.
Maranatha is the youth group for students in grades 7–12, begun in 1984 and still continuing to meet weekly on Sunday nights and sponsor other events throughout the year.
Tenth Church Preschool provides high-quality preschool education, nurturing children through music, literature, learning and play while fostering community for parents.
Medical Campus Outreach is a ministry to medical and other health professional students on medical campuses in and around Philadelphia.
Small group Bible studies meet weekly in host homes across the city of Philadelphia and throughout the suburbs in Pennsylvania and New Jersey
Various other discipleship groups, support groups, and prayer groups meet regularly in the church facilities and elsewhere

References

External links
Official website 
Tenth Presbyterian Church at Philadelphia Architects and Buildings

Churches in Philadelphia
Presbyterian Church in America churches in Pennsylvania
19th-century Presbyterian church buildings in the United States
Religious organizations established in 1829
Churches completed in 1856
1829 establishments in Pennsylvania
Rittenhouse Square, Philadelphia